The IPSC Swedish Mini Rifle Championship is an IPSC level 3 championship held once a year by the Swedish Dynamic Sports Shooting Association.

Champions 
The following is a list of current and previous champions.

Overall category

Lady category

Senior category

Super Senior category

Team category

See also 
Swedish Handgun Championship
Swedish Rifle Championship
Swedish Shotgun Championship

References 

Match Results 2016 IPSC Swedish Mini Rifle Championship
Match Results 2017 IPSC Swedish Mini Rifle Championship

IPSC shooting competitions
National shooting championships
Sweden sport-related lists
Shooting competitions in Sweden